Carlos de la Serna (25 July 1921 – 12 March 2005) was an Argentine equestrian. He competed in two events at the 1956 Summer Olympics.

References

1921 births
2005 deaths
Argentine male equestrians
Olympic equestrians of Argentina
Equestrians at the 1956 Summer Olympics
Sportspeople from Buenos Aires